The Razor's Edge is a 1944 novel by W. Somerset Maugham.

The Razor's Edge may also refer to:

Film and television 
 The Razor's Edge (1946 film), a film adaptation of Maugham's novel, starring Tyrone Power
 The Razor's Edge (1984 film), a film adaptation of Maugham's novel, starring Bill Murray
 The Razor's Edge, an Australian film of 2005
 "The Razor's Edge", an episode of The Apprentice
 "The Razor's Edge", an episode of Married... with Children
 "Razor's Edge", an episode of SWAT Kats: The Radical Squadron
 "Razor's Edge", an episode of Voltron: Legendary Defender

Literature 
 Razor's Edge (novel), a novel by Ivan Yefremov
 Razor's Edge, a novel by Lisanne Norman
 Razor's Edge, a novel by Dale Brown and Jim DeFelice
 Razor's Edge: The Unofficial History of the Falklands War, a book by Hugh Bicheno

Music 
 The Razor's Edge, a '60s pop rock group
 The Razors Edge (AC/DC album), or the title song, 1990
 The Razor's Edge (Dave Holland album) or the title instrumental, 1987
 Razor's Edge, an album by the Groundhogs, 1985
 "Razor's Edge" (Goanna song), 1983
 "Razor's Edge" (Meat Loaf song), 1983
 "Razor's Edge", a song by Saliva from Survival of the Sickest
 Razor's Edge, the fifth and final movement of "Octavarium", a song by Dream Theater
 "Edge of the Razor", a song by Stephanie Mills from I've Got the Cure, 1984

Other uses 
 Razor's Edge, the signature move (a crucifix powerbomb) of professional wrestler Razor Ramon (Scott Hall)

See also 
 Raiser's Edge, fundraising database program produced by Blackbaud
 Walkin' the Razor's Edge, 1984 album by Helix, a Canadian heavy metal band

it:Razor's Edge